Janina Broniewska née Kunig (5 August 1904 – 17 February 1981) was a Polish writer, author of many stories for children and young adults, a publicist and teacher. She subscribed to radically leftist views and became a communist activist, writer and official.

Broniewska was born in Kalisz.  Between 1934 and 1937, she was the editor of the magazine Płomyk ('Flame') for children. Following the Soviet invasion of Poland, she collaborated with Sztandar Wolności ('The Banner of Freedom'), a newspaper published in Minsk. Between 1944 and 1946, she worked as editor for Polska Zbrojna ('Armed Poland') magazine published at that time for the Polish People's Army. Politically influential in the Polish People's Republic, Broniewska was secretary of the Polish United Workers' Party organization of the Polish Writers' Union. She was the first wife of the poet Władysław Broniewski and a close friend of Wanda Wasilewska.

Broniewska died in Warsaw at the age of 76.

Books

O człowieku, który się kulom nie kłaniał (1948, published by Książka in Warsaw)
Dziesięć serc czerwiennych (1966)
Tamten brzeg mych lat (1973)
Z notatnika korespondenta wojennego (1981)

Notes

1904 births
1981 deaths
People from Kalisz
Polish communists
Women in the Polish military
Polish People's Army personnel
Recipients of the Order of Polonia Restituta (1944–1989)
Burials at Powązki Military Cemetery
Polish children's writers
Polish women children's writers
20th-century Polish women